Stamford Independent School District is a public school district based in Stamford, Texas (US).   Located in Jones County, a portion of the district extends into Haskell County.

Schools
 Stamford High School
 Stamford Middle School
 Oliver Elementary School

Stamford High School won state football championships in 1955, 1956, 1958, 2012, and 2013.  The team also won the 1959 game over Brady, but was forced to forfeit the game, the first instance in UIL football history (and only one of two such instances) where the championship was later forfeited.

In 2009, the school district was rated "academically acceptable" by the Texas Education Agency.

References

External links
 Stamford ISD

School districts in Jones County, Texas
School districts in Haskell County, Texas